The International Symposium on Distributed Computing (DISC) is an annual academic conference for refereed presentations, whose focus is the theory, design, analysis, implementation, and application of distributed systems and networks. The Symposium is organized in association with the European Association for Theoretical Computer Science (EATCS). 

The Edsger W. Dijkstra Prize in Distributed Computing is presented alternately at DISC and at the ACM Symposium on Principles of Distributed Computing (PODC).

History
DISC dates back to 1985, when it began as a biannual Workshop on Distributed Algorithms on Graphs (WDAG); it became annual in 1989. The name changed to the present one in 1998.

While the first WDAG was held in Ottawa, Canada in 1985, since then WDAG/DISC has been organised primarily in European locations, one exception being WDAG 1992 in Haifa, Israel. In September 2010, DISC returned to North America for the first time since 1985: 24th DISC took place in Cambridge, Massachusetts, USA. In the same year, its North American sister conference PODC was held in Europe (Zurich) for the first time in its history.

Locations

 2022: Augusta, Georgia, USA
 2021: Freiburg, Germany
 2020: Held virtually, due to the COVID-19 pandemic
 2019: Budapest, Hungary
 2018: New Orleans, Louisiana, USA
 2017: Vienna, Austria
 2016: Paris, France
 2015: Tokyo, Japan
 2014: Austin, Texas, USA
 2013: Jerusalem, Israel
 2012: Salvador, Brazil
 2011: Rome, Italy
 2010: Cambridge, Massachusetts, USA
 2009: Elche, Spain
 2008: Arcachon, France
 2007: Lemesos, Cyprus
 2006: Stockholm, Sweden
 2005: Kraków, Poland
 2004: Amsterdam, Netherlands
 2003: Sorrento, Italy
 2002: Toulouse, France
 2001: Lisboa, Portugal
 2000: Toledo, Spain
 1999: Bratislava, Slovakia
 1998: Andros, Greece
 1997: Saarbrücken, Germany
 1996: Bologna, Italy
 1995: Mont Saint-Michel, France
 1994: Terschelling, Netherlands
 1993: Lausanne, Switzerland
 1992: Haifa, Israel
 1991: Delphi, Greece
 1990: Bari, Italy
 1989: Nice, France
 1987: Amsterdam, Netherlands
 1985: Ottawa, Canada

See also
 The list of distributed computing conferences contains other academic conferences in distributed computing.
 The list of computer science conferences contains other academic conferences in computer science.

Notes

External links
 

Distributed computing conferences
Theoretical computer science conferences